Santa Maria a Cetrella is a Franciscan chapel and hermitage in Anacapri, Capri, Italy. Referred to as "Capri's most otherworldly church", it contains a Madonna statue which is venerated by pilgrims, including Rainer Maria Rilke. Built in the Middle Ages, its features include stucco siding, with a low-vaulted ceiling.

It is located on Mount Solaro's Cetrella region. In the Middle Ages, Capriote residents prayed to Santa Maria a Cetrella to intercede on behalf of the island's fishermen.

References

Roman Catholic churches in Capri, Campania
Maria a Cetrella